A Faraway Land is a 2021 Philippine film directed by Veronica Velasco starring Paolo Contis and Yen Santos.

Premise
Filipino reporter Nico Mercado from Cabanatuan heads to the Faroe Islands for a documentary about Overseas Filipino Workers (OFWs) in the Danish territory. He meets Filipino expatriate Mahjoy, who is married to Sigmund Garðalið, a local Faroese with whom she has a daughter. Nico develops a complicated relationship with Mahjoy in Sigmund's absence.

Cast
Paolo Contis as Nico Mercado
Yen Santos as Mahjoy Garðalið
Hans Tórgarð as Sigmund Garðalið

Production
A Faraway Land was produced by MavX Productions and directed by Veronica Velasco. Principal photography took place between November and December 6, 2020 in the Faroe Islands amidst the COVID-19 pandemic. This followed MavX's film Through Night and Day which was filmed in nearby Iceland.

Release
Due to the COVID-19 pandemic, the film's premiere did not occur in live cinema. A Faraway Land was made available instead through Netflix on August 19, 2021.

Awards and nominations

References

External links

2021 films
2021 romantic drama films
Films about journalists
Films not released in theaters due to the COVID-19 pandemic
Films directed by Veronica Velasco
Films set in the Faroe Islands
Philippine romantic drama films